The Satellite P series was Toshiba Information Systems's secondary premium line of Satellite laptops introduced in 2003. It later eclipsed Toshiba's primary premium line of Satellites, the A series, in 2011.

The first entry in the series, the P25, was one of the first laptops to feature a widescreen 17-in LCD, following in the footsteps of Apple's PowerBook G4 released the same year. The P25 was also one of the first laptops to feature an internal DVD±RW drive. PC Magazine rated it well as a multimedia system.

P series models introduced in 2012 were priced at US$800, $100 higher than their midrange S series counterparts. Features of the 2012-issue P series models included Nvidia GeForce graphics processing units, Harman Kardon speakers, optional touchscreen displays and backlit keyboards as standard. Toshiba offered 15.6- or 17.3-inch-diagonal screens for these models at 1080p resolution, with an bevel-free design for the display housings. The integrated graphics chip and HDMI ports also supported 4K output.

Toshiba discontinued the P series in 2016 along with the entire Satellite line of laptops.

Models

References

Satellite P series